Forgive Me If I Die is a 1989 Azerbaijani drama film about love and death directed by Rasim Ojagov, written by Rustam Ibragimbekov, and starring Fakhraddin Manafov, Gulzar Gurbanova, Sadaya Mustafayeva and Mukhtar Maniyev. The film narrates the life story of Yusif, a man who got a contusion during the Second World War, deserted the army prior to the end of the war, arrested because of that, and saw his girlfriend married to the other man.

Cast

Production
The movie was shot in Baku and Kislovodsk in 1989.

References

External links 
 

1989 films
1989 crime drama films
Azerbaijani drama films
Soviet drama films
Azerbaijani-language films
Azerbaijani multilingual films